Living Hard is the seventh studio album by American country music singer Gary Allan. It was released on October 23, 2007 via MCA Nashville.

The album debuted at number three on the U.S. Billboard 200 chart, selling approximately 69,000 copies during its first week. Its lead-off single, "Watching Airplanes", reached number 2 on the country charts, its second single "Learning How to Bend" peaked at number 13, and the third single "She's So California" went to number 24.  "Like It's a Bad Thing" was later recorded by Danny Gokey on his 2010 debut album My Best Days. "Half of My Mistakes" was written by Bobby Houck and Radney Foster and originally recorded by Houck's band, the Blue Dogs, on their 2004 album, Halos and Good Buys, then by Foster on his 2004 album And Then There's Me (The Back Porch Sessions), and finally by Jace Everett on his 2005 self-titled debut album.

Track listing

Personnel
From Living Hard liner notes.
Musicians
Perry Coleman - background vocals
Chad Cromwell - drums
Eric Darken - percussion
Dan Dugmore - steel guitar
Jerry Flowers - background vocals
Kenny Greenberg - electric guitar
Jaime Hanna - electric guitar, background vocals
Wes Hightower - background vocals
The Love Sponge Strings - strings
Steve Nathan - piano, Hammond B-3 organ, Wurlitzer electric piano
Russ Pahl - steel guitar, acoustic guitar
Jon Randall - background vocals
Michael Rhodes - bass guitar
Brent Rowan - electric guitar
Hank Singer - fiddle
Russell Terrell - background vocals
Robby Turner - steel guitar
John Willis - acoustic guitar, mandolin
Glenn Worf - bass guitar

Technical
Gary Allan - producer
Greg Droman - recording, mixing
Hank Williams - mastering
Kris Wilkinson - string arranger
Mark Wright - producer

Charts

Weekly charts

Year-end charts

Certifications

References

2007 albums
Gary Allan albums
MCA Records albums
Albums produced by Mark Wright (record producer)